George Hall Large (December 1, 1850 – August 15, 1939) was an American lawyer and Republican Party politician who served as President of the New Jersey Senate. He was also the longest surviving participant in the first-ever college football game in 1869.

Early life

Large was born in 1850 in the Whitehouse Station section of Readington Township, Hunterdon County, New Jersey, the son of John K. and Eliza (Hall) Large. He was tutored at local schools before attending Rutgers College.

On November 6, 1869, Large was one of 25 Rutgers players to face The College of New Jersey (now Princeton University) in the first intercollegiate football game ever played, at College Field in New Brunswick, New Jersey. Midway through the game, Large collided with Princeton player J.E. Michael, known as "Big Mike." Large was knocked unconscious but was revived after several minutes. Rutgers went on to win the game by a score of 6–4.

At Rutgers, Large was also associate editor of The Targum. He graduated in 1872.

Legal and political career

After graduating from Rutgers, Large read law and was admitted to the New Jersey bar in 1875. He first practiced law with his brother-in-law John N. Voorhees in Flemington and then opened his own law office in 1882.

In 1885, Large ran successfully for the New Jersey Senate on the Republican ticket. He was the first Republican elected to the State Senate from traditionally Democratic Hunterdon County. In 1888, he was selected as Senate President, and he served as acting governor when Governor Robert S. Green was out of the state.

In 1889, President Benjamin Harrison appointed Large the Collector of Internal Revenue for New Jersey's Fifth District. He served in this position for five years before returning to private practice.

Large joined with his son, George K. Large, to establish the Flemington law firm of Large & Large (later known as Large, Scammell & Danziger). From 1900, he owned the Greek Revival mansion located at 117 Main Street in Flemington, designed in 1847 for James N. Reading (now known as the Reading-Large House). The historic Reading-Large house is currently occupied by the law firm of Large, Scammell & Danziger LLC and other businesses.

Later life

Large married the former Josephine Ramsey on November 15, 1877, and she died not long before their sixtieth anniversary, on January 5, 1937. They had three children: George Knowles (born February 3, 1879), Edwin Kirk (born August 14, 1880), and Helen Brokaw (born August 12, 1889). George K. Large served as judge of the Hunterdon County Court of Common Pleas and was an assistant prosecutor in the Lindbergh kidnapping trial. Edwin K. Large served as postmaster of Atlanta, Georgia.

Large outlived all of the other participants in the 1869 Rutgers-Princeton game. On November 5, 1938, when Rutgers defeated Princeton for the first time since the original game, Large was on hand for the victory. Coincidentally, William Preston Lane, the last surviving Princeton player, had died that morning.

In 1939, Large died at his Flemington home at the age of 88.

References

External links
 George H. Large at The Political Graveyard

1850 births
1939 deaths
19th-century players of American football
People from Flemington, New Jersey
People from Readington Township, New Jersey
Players of American football from New Jersey
Rutgers University alumni
New Jersey lawyers
Republican Party New Jersey state senators
Presidents of the New Jersey Senate
American lawyers admitted to the practice of law by reading law